Events in the year 1931 in Brazil.

Incumbents

Federal government 
 President: Getúlio Vargas (Head of the Provisional Government)
 Vice President: none

Governors 
 Alagoas: 
 till 9 August: Hermilo de Freitas Blackbird
 9 August-31 October: Louis de France Albuquerque
 from 31 October: Tasso de Oliveira Tinoco
 Amazonas: Álvaro Botelho Maia
 Bahia: Leopoldo Afrânio Bastos do Amaral, then Raimundo Rodrigues Barbosa, then Juracy Magalhães
 Ceará: 
 till 13 June: Manuel Fernandes Távora
 13 June - 22 September: João da Silva Leal
 from 22 September: Roberto Carneiro de Mendonça
 Goiás: Pedro Ludovico Teixeira
 Maranhão:
 till 9 January: José Maria Perdigão
 9 January - 18 August: Astolfo Serra
 18 August - 8 September: Joaquim Aquino Correia
 from 8 September: Lourival Seroa da Mota
 Mato Grosso: Antonino Mena Gonçalves, then Artur Antunes Maciel
 Minas Gerais: Olegário Maciel
 Pará: Joaquim de Magalhães Barata
 Paraíba: Antenor de França Navarro
 Paraná: 
 Mário Alves Monteiro Tourinho
 João Perneta
 Pernambuco: Carlos de Lima Cavalcanti
 Piauí:
 till 29 January: Humberto de Areia Leão
 29 January - May 21: Joaquim de Lemos Cunha
 from 21 May: Landry Sales
 Rio Grande do Norte: 
 till 28 January: Irenaeus Jofili
 29 January - 31 July: Aluisio de Moura Andrade
 from 31 July: Hercolino Cascardo
 Rio Grande do Sul: José Antônio Flores da Cunha
 Santa Catarina:
 São Paulo: 
 Sergipe:

Vice governors 
 Rio Grande do Norte:
 São Paulo:

Events 

15 January – Eleven Italian seaplanes led by Italo Balbo land at Botafogo Bay after a 6,000 mile flight from Italy that began on December 17. The pilots are greeted by President Getúlio Vargas.
16 September – Frente Negra Brasileira, Brazil's first Black political party, is founded.
12 October – The statue of Christ the Redeemer, overlooking Rio de Janeiro, is consecrated.
date unknown
The Caiçaras Club is founded in Rio de Janeiro.

Arts and culture

Books
Jorge Amado – O País do Carnaval (The Country of Carnival)
Júlio Afrânio Peixoto – História da literatura brasileira

Films
Limite, directed by Mário Peixoto

Music
Zequinha de Abreu's piece "Tico-Tico no Farelo" is renamed "Tico-Tico no Fubá"

Births 
8 January – Ozires Silva, entrepreneur, founder of Embraer
19 January – Ottomar Pinto, politician, Governor of Roraima (2004–2007) (died 2007)
10 February – Cauby Peixoto, singer (died 2016)
16 March – Augusto Boal, theatre director, writer and politician (died 2009)
2 March – Ruth Rocha, writer
31 March – Ary Fernandes, playwright, actor, producer and filmmaker (died 2010)
28 April – Nair Bello, actress and comedian (died 2007)
8 May – Etty Fraser, actress (died 2018)
10 June – João Gilberto, singer and guitarist (died 2019)
13 June – Moysés Baumstein, holographer and artist (died 1991)
18 June – Fernando Henrique Cardoso, 34th President of Brazil
31 August – Mário Zagallo, footballer and manager
3 September – Paulo Maluf, politician
16 October – Mílton Alves da Silva, football player (died 1973)
17 October – José Alencar, politician (died 2011)

Deaths 
26 January – Graça Aranha, writer and diplomat (born 1868)
9 June – Henrique Oswald, pianist and composer (born 1852) 
24 July – Nonô, footballer (born 1899)
8 September – Prince Luiz Gastão of Orléans-Braganza, descendant of the Brazilian Imperial Family (born 1911)
6 October – Oscar Cox, sportsman (born 1880)

References

See also 
1931 in Brazilian football
List of Brazilian films of 1931

 
1930s in Brazil
Years of the 20th century in Brazil
Brazil
Brazil